The post-graduate diploma in management studies, post-nominal letters DMS, is a university management qualification in the United Kingdom.

History

Early structure
The post-graduate qualification was originally accredited by the DMS Committee of the DES. It originally required either one year full-time or 3 years part-time study, and was arranged in two discrete sections: Part A and Part B. It was compulsory to pass the Part A examinations and assessment first before being allowed to take Part B. Part B consisted of the final examinations and a project dissertation. Overall the marks achieved in coursework, examinations and the final dissertation had to exceed a weighted threshold for the candidate to pass and be awarded a DMS. It was thus quite an intensive course with a large workload. If a candidate achieved 90% or above, they were awarded a Distinction.

Entry requirements
Normally a bachelor's degree or extensive managerial experience and/or other professional qualifications. Originally there was also a lower age limit for entry of 35 years old, but this requirement was subsequently dropped as managers above that age found that the qualification had no value in achieving employment or promotion above 35.

Accreditation
Initially in the UK the qualification was accredited by the DMS committee of the DES, and later by the Council for National Academic Awards (CNAA). It was originally accepted by the BIM as its core qualification for admission as a full member. The BIM subsequently was renamed to the Institute of Management when combining with the Institute of Industrial Managers, and now has again been renamed to become the Chartered Management Institute.

Assessment
The assessment for the few DMS courses which are still run in the UK is now almost without any formal examinations being required to be passed. It is thus subjectively awarded on the basis of course performance only, according to the opinion of the academic staff responsible.

Controversy

It has been argued by some that the move away from mainly or wholly exam assessed courses has lessened the 'value of the qualification' however the change from exams to coursework, projects and assignments is fairly in keeping with most postgraduate UK qualifications, although some exams are normally required.

Recognition
The DMS is accepted by the CMI as part of the required qualification for chartered manager.

See also
 Master of business administration

References

Management education
Educational qualifications in the United Kingdom
Business qualifications